The Focke-Wulf Fw 206 was a German planned commercial aircraft, designed by Focke-Wulf. The aircraft was designed to be an all-metal, low-wing monoplane, and was to be powered by two BMW Bramo 323 R engines, each producing . The prototype was not produced, however, due to the start of World War II.

The design heavily resembled the Douglas DC-3.

Specifications

References

Fw 206
Abandoned civil aircraft projects
1930s German airliners
Low-wing aircraft
Twin piston-engined tractor aircraft